The OnePlus 9 5G and 9 Pro 5G are Android-based smartphones manufactured by OnePlus, unveiled on March 23, 2021. The phones feature upgraded cameras developed in partnership with Hasselblad.

Specifications

Hardware
Both the OnePlus 9 and 9 Pro use the Snapdragon 888 processor with the Adreno 660 GPU, with either 128 or 256 GB of non-expandable UFS 3.1 storage. Both have 8 GB or 12 GB of LPPDDR5 RAM. Both have stereo speakers with active noise cancellation and no audio jack, similar to the previous generation OnePlus 8/8Pro and OnePlus 8T.

Design 
The OnePlus 9 and 9 Pro have similar designs to the previous generation OnePlus 8 and 8 Pro, with Gorilla Glass 5 on the front and back, and a "hole punch"-style camera in the upper left-hand corner. The 9's screen is flat with a plastic frame and a 2.5D edge, while the 9 Pro's screen is curved with an aluminum frame. Only the 9 Pro has an official IP Code (IP68); the regular OnePlus 9 is claimed by OnePlus to have water resistance, but has no official IP certification. The OnePlus 9 is available in three colors: Winter Mist, Arctic Sky, and Astral Black. The OnePlus 9 Pro is available in three different colors: Morning Mist, Pine Green, and Stellar Black.

Display
Both the OnePlus 9 and 9 Pro have an AMOLED HDR10+ screen with a 120 Hz refresh rate, with the 9 Pro featuring an adaptive refresh rate (meaning that the refresh rate is adjusted based on task) as it uses an LTPO backplane. The OnePlus 9 has a 6.55 inch FHD+ display and a pixel density of 402 ppi, while the 9 Pro has a 6.7 inch QHD+ display and a pixel density of 525 ppi. The 9 Pro has 10-bit color depth, which allows it to display up to 1 billion colors, like its predecessor.

Both have an in-display optical fingerprint scanner and facial recognition as biometric options. The fingerprint sensor is placed lower than in the OnePlus 8 series.

Camera 
The OnePlus 9 and 9 Pro both feature upgraded camera systems from their previous generations. The main upgrade is in the optics and color processing, which were co-developed with Hasselblad, specifically in the ultra-wide camera. Both phones now feature the same ultra-wide cameras. The wide sensor is a 1/1.43" Sony IMX789 on the OnePlus 9 Pro and an IMX689 on the OnePlus 9 (as in the previous generation OnePlus 8 Pro) and the ultra-wide sensor is a 1/1.56" Sony IMX766.

The 9 Pro features an additional 77 mm, 8 MP,  telephoto camera that uses the same sensor as the previous generation OnePlus 8 Pro.

Battery 
Both phones feature a 4500 mAh lithium polymer battery. This is an increase from the regular OnePlus 8, and a slight decrease from the 8 Pro. Both feature 65 W fast charging, termed "Warp Charge 65T", with the included USB-C power brick. The regular OnePlus 9 now features 15 W fast wireless charging, which in the previous series was only included with the 8 Pro, though the feature is only available in certain regions. The 9 Pro now features 50 W fast wireless charging with the purchase of the official OnePlus-branded 50 W wireless charger. This is an increase from 30 W fast wireless charging in the previous generation.

Software 
Both phones shipped originally with OxygenOS 11, based on Android 11. Since then, both phones have been updated to ColorOS 13, based on Android 13, and will receive Android updates up to Android 14.

Reception

Performance throttling controversy 
An investigation by AnandTech revealed on July 6, 2021, that the OnePlus 9 and 9 Pro throttle the performance of popular apps by limiting them to the processor's slower cores. As a result, benchmarks in apps such as Google Chrome performed up to 85% slower than competing phones that use the same Snapdragon 888 processor, such as the Samsung Galaxy S21 Ultra and Asus Zenfone 8. News website Android Authority then performed their own tests, and found that both devices perform approximately 74% worse in Chrome benchmarks than the predecessor OnePlus 8. When running the same benchmark in the Microsoft Edge web browser, which is not throttled, the 9 Pro outperformed the OnePlus 8's Chrome result by about 7%. The next day, OnePlus admitted in a statement to multiple news outlets that it was throttling the performance of as many as 300 popular apps, claiming the decision was made after complaints from users about battery life and overheating issues with the devices.

Multiple outlets criticised OnePlus for introducing the throttling feature without informing device owners. The day after the AnandTech report, performance benchmarking app Geekbench removed the OnePlus 9 and 9 Pro from its website, calling it "benchmark manipulation".

Notes

References

External links

OnePlus mobile phones
Android (operating system) devices
Mobile phones introduced in 2021
Mobile phones with multiple rear cameras
Mobile phones with 8K video recording